Ernie Buriano (born July 24, 1957) is a retired Argentine-American footballer. He played in the Major Indoor Soccer League, United Soccer League, American Soccer League and National Professional Soccer League

In 1979, he signed with the expansion Buffalo Stallions of the Major Indoor Soccer League.  He spent five seasons with the Stallions, leaving the team only after it folded.  In 1982, he played for the Rochester Flash.  After the Stallions folded, Buriano spent the 1984 outdoor season with the Buffalo Storm of the United Soccer League.  In October 1984, he signed with the Baltimore Blast.  On January 9, 1987, the Blast traded Buriano and Frantz Mathieu to the Chicago Sting in exchange for Drago Dumbovic.  The Sting released Buriano and ten other players in June 1988.  Buriano moved his family back to Argentina that summer where he continued to play and coach.  He eventually returned to the United States and became a citizen in the early 1990s.  In 1993, he signed with the Buffalo Blizzard of the National Professional Soccer League.   He played two seasons in Buffalo.  In 1996, Buriano and his wife opened a Jani-King cleaning franchise in Buffalo.  In November 2000, the Buffalo Blizzard hired Buriano as an assistant coach.

References

External links
 MISL stats

1957 births
American soccer players
Argentine footballers
Argentine emigrants to the United States
American Soccer League (1933–1983) players
Baltimore Blast (1980–1992) players
Buffalo Blizzard players
Buffalo Stallions players
Buffalo Storm players
Chicago Sting (MISL) players
Las Vegas Seagulls players
Major Indoor Soccer League (1978–1992) players
Miami Americans players
National Professional Soccer League (1984–2001) coaches
National Professional Soccer League (1984–2001) players
Rochester Flash players
United Soccer League (1984–85) players
Living people
Association football defenders
Association football midfielders
Argentine football managers
Sportspeople from Entre Ríos Province